

Open water swimming

Syria qualified one quota place for the following event in open water swimming.

Swimming
Women

Nations at the 2009 World Aquatics Championships
Syria at the World Aquatics Championships
2009 in Syrian sport